Puchong Gateway is a new township in Puchong, Selangor, Malaysia. This township is located south of Puchong area. It is accessible via Damansara–Puchong Expressway  from Petaling Jaya.

Petaling District
Townships in Selangor